The Pirelli Internetional Award was first offered in 1996, as the first international multimedia competition for the communication of science & technology conducted entirely on the internet. Since then, annual awards have been granted to the best multimedia presentations focussing on themes involving the diffusion of science and technology.  The multimedia presentations must deal with either physics, chemistry, mathematics, life sciences, or the enabling information and communication technologies that empower multimedia itself. According to Marco Tronchetti Provera, President of the Pirelli Group, the award was established in the belief that the diffusion of social, economic and technological advances are as important as their discovery. As the name indicates, the award is sponsored by the Pirelli Corporation.

Judging

An international jury of notable people including Nobel Prize laureates reviews the top entries.

With an overall budget prize of 105,000 euro (about US$ 130,000), awards are granted in the following major categories: physics, chemistry, mathematics, life sciences, and information and communications technology.

Award Categories

Physics

This category rewards the best multimedia works coming from the field of physics and amounts to an award of 15,000 euro.

Chemistry

This category rewards the best multimedia works coming from the field of chemistry and amounts to an award of 15,000 euro.

Mathematics

This category rewards the best multimedia work coming from the field of mathematics and amounts to an award of 15,000 euro.

Life Sciences

This category rewards the best multimedia work coming from the field of life sciences and amounts to an award of 15,000 euro.

Information and Communications Technology

This special category prize rewards those multimedia works which represent a relevant contribution to Information and Communications Technology by means of a product, process, or service, and is deemed to be of particular significance to the jury in that the Pirelli Internetional Award is predicated in large degree to contributions such as these. The Information and Communications Technology prize amounts to 15,000 euro.

Top Pirelli Prize

The Top Pirelli Prize is the supreme recognition that the international jury grants a multimedia work which best embodies the philosophy of the Pirelli Internetional Award. In fact, the Top Pirelli Prize is considered the overall winner. It amounts to an additional 10,000 euro on top of the monetary award granted in any of the five regular categories. The Top Pirelli Prize was first awarded in 2001 (five years after the inception of the Pirelli Award) to Prof. Robert C. Michelson for his work on the Entomopter, a biologically inspired insect-like aerial robot.

Past Award Winners

Winners of the Pirelli Award (First Prize for best from any institution, and Top Pirelli Prize):

1996 First Prize: Elisa Manacorda (Italy) for GalileoNet.it

1997 First Prize: Marco Ziegler (Switzerland) for sgich1.unifr.ch/visu.html

1998 First Prize: Jurgen Renn (Germany) for the Institute and Museum of the History of Science

1999 First Prize: Ericsson Medialab (Sweden) for Warriors of the Net

2000 First Prize: Roberto Fieschi (INFM, Italy) for maccw.sns.it/technet

2001 First Prize and Top Pirelli Prize: Robert C. Michelson (Georgia Institute of Technology, USA) for the Entomopter Project

2002 First Prize and Top Pirelli Prize: Howard Hughes Medical Institute (USA) for GVirtual Labs

2003 First Prize and Top Pirelli Prize: David Grubin Productions, Thirteen/WNET and Docstar (USA) for Secret Life of the Brain

2004 First Prize and Top Pirelli Prize: Patrick J. Lynch (Yale University, USA) for the Yale-New Haven Medical Center

2005 First Prize and Top Pirelli Prize: Roeland van der Marel and Gijs Verdoes Kleijn (Space Telescope Science Institute, Netherlands/USA) and Educational Web Adventures (Netherlands/USA) for Black Holes: Gravity's Relentless Pull

2006 First Prize and Top Pirelli Prize: New Index (Norway) for the  Interactive Mobile Whiteboard

2007 First Prize and Top Pirelli Prize: Space Telescope Institute/Google (USA) for  Google Sky

Future
In a July 2, 2008 communique, author and manager of the Pirelli Internetional Award, Massimo Armeni,  announced that Pirelli would no longer be conducting the award on an annual basis, however no indication was given as to when the next competition for the award would be announced.

See also

 List of engineering awards
 List of computer science awards

References

External links
Official Pirelli Award web site Describes the purpose, categories, history, and rules for winning the Pirelli Award. (Retrieved 25 June 2014)
The Video Of Pirelli Award on YouTube

Computer science awards
Science and technology awards
Pirelli